Village Vanguard Live Sessions 3 is an unedited rough-mix of the Thad Jones / Mel Lewis Jazz Orchestra playing at the Village Vanguard club in New York City in 1967. The tracks were previously released on the album Live at the Village Vanguard on the Solid State Records label.

Track listing 

 "Gettin' Sassy" ("Don't Get Sassy") – 8:40
 "Little Pixie" – 10:35
 "The Second Race" – 14:45
 "Willow Tree" (Razaf, Waller) – 5:00
 "A- That's Freedom" (H. Jones) – 9:23
 "Quietude" – 5:00
 "Baca Feelin'" ("Bachafillen") (Brown) – 8:50

All songs composed by Thad Jones except as noted.

Personnel 
 Thad Jones – flugelhorn
 Snooky Young – trumpet
 Jimmy Nottingham – trumpet
 Richard Williams – trumpet
 Bob Brookmeyer – trombone
 Garnett Brown – trombone
 Tom McIntosh – trombone
 Cliff Heather – bass trombone
 Jerome Richardson – alto saxophone
 Jerry Dodgion – alto saxophone
 Eddie Daniels – tenor saxophone
 Joe Farrell  – tenor saxophone
 Pepper Adams –  baritone saxophone
 Roland Hanna – piano
 Richard Davis – bass
 Mel Lewis – drums

References

The Thad Jones/Mel Lewis Orchestra live albums